Prince Edward-Gallion State Forest is a state forest located in Prince Edward County, Virginia.  Virginia's first state forest, it was founded upon land donated to the Commonwealth by its namesake, Emmett Dandridge Gallion.  Its  provide a number of recreational opportunities.  Within its boundaries is Twin Lakes State Park.

References
Park webpage

Virginia state forests
Protected areas of Prince Edward County, Virginia